Whiteness theory is a field under Whiteness studies, that studies what White identity means in terms of social, political, racial, economic, culture, etc. Whiteness Theory also looks at how Whiteness is centric in society and culture, and in creating a potential blindness to privileges associated with White identity that excludes and harms the racial other.

Whiteness theory is an offshoot of critical race theory that sees race as a social construct. It posits that practice of Whiteness are visible systems of whiteness that white people use to maintain power to benefit only white people. Critical Whiteness Theory positions Whiteness as the default of North American and European cultures, and as a result of this default, majority of white people are allegedly blind to the advantages and disadvantages of being White due to the dominant cultural and social processes created through the ongoing and historical performativity of whiteness. Stemming from the lack of cultural awareness, humanity, and empathy with racial others as a result of being White, Whiteness Theory looks at the social, power, and economic challenges that arise from disregard or denial of white privilege, and the use of strategies of whiteness to reassert white space, also known as white degeneracy.

History of Whiteness

North America

Whiteness as a social identity formed in the colonial and post-colonial era. In the colonial era social class was important than race among white people, however during the post-colonial era, social changes gave non-whites an opportunity to engage freely in the economy and those changes economically threatened lower and middle class white people. Racism and racialization where required tools for distinguishing oneself from non-whites, and preventing non-whites from utilizing their freedom for sustainable growth. The opportunism for gaining an economical advantage motivated the lower and middle class white people to reproduce what whiteness can be in order to have a privileged lifestyle, and it was augmented and legitimized by the surviving plantation bourgeoisie class through social and psychological courtesies for further protecting their own privileges. White race solidarity in upholding whiteness through centuries is one of the strongest and ever growing class collaborationism seen in North America.

Pillars of Whiteness theory

Whiteness as default 
Whiteness is a socially constructed concept, identified as the normal and centric racial identity. As Whiteness is the standard to which racial minorities are compared, Whiteness is understood as the default standard. Whiteness Theory establishes Whiteness as default, through which social, political, and economic complications arise from  Whiteness and its creation of color blindness. The ideologies, social norms, and behaviors associated with white culture are the comparative standard to which all races are objectified to.

The defaulting of Whiteness establishes a reality in which White people, as victims of their race as centric, do not experience the adversity of those with minority identification. An otherization of minorities can occur with Whiteness as a default, where Whiteness Theory identifies Whiteness as invisible to those who possess it, resulting in both intended and untended otherization. Whiteness as default presents socioeconomic privileges and advantages over racial minorities, which also might go unrecognized by White people that are not objectified by some other standard of adversity.

Whiteness as centric 
As the majority of Americans are White, Whiteness is considered the default race of the United States, the existing cultural norms of Whiteness are classified as the norms of American culture. Such classifications include stereotypical expectancies of behavior, in which a binary system is created that classifies a person's culture as either "White" or "other." Majority racial status plays a major role for those of white identity creating cultural "norms," as one's behaviors and expectations of how a culture should live and interact is more easily reinforced by association with the majority. Lack of awareness parallels the centric nature of Whiteness as majority through self-imposed color blindness, existing through the reality of White privilege.

Whiteness theory studies the way that White identity passively creates the otherization of color. Color is a construct that can be objectified, made from the existence of Whiteness as majority and centric. Such a perception Whiteness as "normal" leads to an underrepresentation and misrepresentation of minority individuals.

White identity 
The idea of Whiteness as "normal" reinforces the idea of racial marginalization, through which an identity of Whiteness may be created through the antithesis of subjugated "otherized" cultures. Much of White identity is formulated around the absence of an identity. Because there is no association towards being objectified by social, racial, economic, or judicial systems for the middle-class White identifiers, White identity for an individual may be intentionally crafted to suit the wants and needs of the individual. Such a choice of "coloring in" one's Whiteness is a reflection of the privileges of Whiteness and a lack of diverse community association.

White privilege 
In the United States, White privilege is theorized to exist due to the hierarchy of power distribution, where White men were granted institutional power over minorities in the establishment of the country's political, social, and economic systems. White privilege resides in the idea that White people inherit a color blindness due to their majority status, refuting the existence of racism and racial privilege because of a lack of association with those realities. The privileges of being in the majority are unknown by the majority, paradoxically, because they are the majority and are not subjected to the social trials of being a minority. White people have received a more sympathetic media treatment than black people, for example having been portrayed as mentally ill, after they had committed a serious crime such as a mass shooting.

Lack of discrimination is an underlying principle of White privilege, as the privileges available to the White majority are not as readily enjoyed by those of minority status. Such privileges include, but are not limited to: owning/renting of property, equal racial representation in law and society, unbiased education, assumption of intellectual, social, or financial capability, unbiased credibility. Privilege is multi-faceted in its existence; each of these realities and countless others are the subject of White privilege, as discrimination is faced by minority subjects while trying to enjoy such realities.

White bias 
White bias is in reference to majority stronghold that White people possess. Those of a particular racial identity (whiteness) have selective preference of granting power and privileges to those of the same ethnicity, referred to as ingroup bias. Such strongholds may be categorically associated to the social, educational, economic, political, racial, and cultural privileges associated by the majority White.  Institutionally power is granted hierarchically, and in majority, to those who that associate most with the power holders. Racial bias exists as a barrier to entry for many minority power seekers, where a gatekeeping effect is created by those in the majority who are reluctant to pass power onto the minority, whether through qualification-based or discrimination-based motives.

Socially, institutional slavery, then racism has played a major role in the discrimination of not only African-Americans, but as well other minority affiliations as suboptimal. Economically, access to higher-paying jobs and wage gap discrimination are an ongoing discourse demanding institutional change, both as a result of White bias. Politically, racial bias is seen with the highly sought after Presidential office, where America's first black president Barack Obama was not elected until 2008, being preceded by 43 White presidents by him and being followed by a White president Donald Trump as the 45th.

Critiquing whiteness 
Communication research revolving around critical race theory seeks to understand the privileges and associations of whiteness. The critical aspect of research involves the realization of white enrichment, where white people have profited from the injustices done unto minorities (see European colonization of the Americas and slavery) both knowingly and unknowingly. Systems in the United States more often than not create privileged realities where white people may succeed more than those of minority identity, also allowing those of white identity to more easily change and manipulate the system to their favor.

A component of critical whiteness theory seeks to understand how white people acknowledge their privileges, as well as the corresponding positive or negative behaviors through their acknowledgements. Unique qualitative research is derived from how normative whiteness is in our culture, associated with how color blindness and privilege blindness affect interracial contexts of communication, as well as the white perception of injustices done unto minorities in America.

Whiteness theory in communication studies 
The tenets of white privilege are incorporated into whiteness theory to understand the respective communicative possibilities of each tenet. Studying how white privilege is perceived by white people, how well white people perceive white privilege, how white people think their white privilege affects their identity, how white identity is derived from and conflicts with other racial identities, and how white privilege is perceived by minorities are all a limited set of possibilities created by whiteness theory. These theoretical studies can be manipulated by the following variables of whiteness theory:

 Centric whiteness
 Whiteness as the default
 Whiteness as normative
 Whiteness and rhetoric
 White identity
 White racial culture
 White bias
 White interaction with minorities
 Whiteness and inequality
 White cultural cannibalism
 Whiteness and education
 Whiteness and politics
 Whiteness and popular culture
 Whiteness and gender

Whiteness theory in audio-visual studies 
Spike Lee's 1989 film Do the Right Thing explores Whiteness theory through the social, economic, racial and cultural identities of the white characters Sal, Vito and Pino. The film follows another day in the life of Mookie, an African-American man working for Sal's Famous Pizzeria, and the racial tensions that arise between Sal and Mookie's friend Buggin’ Out. Sal, Vito and Pino are an Italian-American family who own a pizzeria in a predominantly black neighbourhood in Brooklyn, New York, USA. The pizzeria is thus marked as a ‘white spot’ amongst black America, representing what colonised America has become; White American's are working class citizens who capitalise on Black America. This is exemplified through Pino's behaviour toward the African-American customers of the pizzeria through micro-aggressions and slurring of racist remarks while deindividuating Mookie's negative behaviour to be typical of his race, “How come niggers are so stupid?”. As Hughey suggests a feeling of threat to the white normality, Pino attempts to exert his white privilege through his actions. For example, Pino explains that he is fed up with being around black people in this neighbourhood and suggests to his father that they sell Sal's Famous Pizzeria and move to their own neighbourhood instead. Whiteness is also shown through Sal's ‘Wall of Fame’ in his pizzeria which only showcases famous Italian-American individuals. When Buggin’ Out calls for the representation of African-Americans to be included on the wall alongside the Italian-Americans, Sal refuses by replying, “Only Italian-American’s up on the wall”. Sal sees his own cultural and racial identity to be central to his view of American representation and thus is an example of his Whiteness. Another example of Whiteness in the film is when a white man's car is soaked by the suburb's citizens enjoying the water from the fire hydrant on the street. The Police ask the man to describe the men who soaked his car and he says, “Mo and Jo Black…Yeah, they were brothers”. This is an example of what Memmi describes as the ‘mark of plural’, where these two individuals are homogenously deindividualized and thus marked as raced rather than as individuals.

Whiteness theory is further explored in the 2006 film Blood Diamond by Edward Zwick. The film follows Danny Archer, a diamond smuggler whose ticket out of Africa is a pink diamond found and hidden by a local African fisherman, Solomon Vandy. Danny Archer's Whiteness prevails throughout the film. In one scene, Danny pleads to allow Solomon to help him find his family, saying that without the help of himself and the other white people that he knows, Solomon is, “…just another black man in Africa”. On several occasions Danny uses the term T.I.A. (This is Africa) when speaking to white foreigners. It is clear here that the use of this term by a white man in a black country details supposed inherent raced characteristics of Africa that are different to that of the white race. Hughey's  notion of the White Saviour is perfectly depicted in this film also. Not only does Danny Archer dedicate his time and resources to help Solomon Vandy find the diamond and thus his family, he asks for the help of other white characters such as Maddy Bowen which ultimately result in Danny Archer's sacrifice of his own life and the money from the pink diamond to save Solomon Vandy and his family from definitive death.

References

Critical race theory
Politics and race
Postmodernism
Social constructionism
White culture